Mancuso, F.B.I. is an American crime drama television series created by Steve Sohmer, which was aired by NBC from October 13, 1989 to April 24, 1990, as part of its 1989–90 schedule.

Mancuso, F.B.I. stars Robert Loggia as Nick Mancuso, a hardened veteran of the Bureau now assigned to Washington, D.C., where he was largely regarded by his superiors and bureaucratic types as a maverick with little regard for agency rules and procedures.  This charge was largely true; Mancuso's true motivation was, as a press release for the show near the time of its premiere described it, "a passionate love affair with the United States Constitution" and an overwhelming desire to see genuine justice rather than the mere appearance of it.

Inspiration
Mancuso was based on Loggia's portrayal of the character in the NBC political miniseries Favorite Son, starring Harry Hamlin, which had aired the previous fall to high ratings.  Apparently much of the audience for the former show had tuned in to see Hamlin; Mancuso was cancelled at the end of the season.  However, selected episodes were rerun by NBC as part of its summer prime time lineup in 1993.

Loggia earned an Emmy nomination as outstanding lead actor in a dramatic series for his performance.

"Nick Mancuso" is also a name shared by a real-life actor (NBC series Stingray, 1985–1987), as well as a Boston-based writer.

Cast
 Robert Loggia as Nick Mancuso
 Randi Brazen as Jean St. John
 Frederic Lehne as Eddie McMasters
 Charles Siebert as Dr. Paul Summers
 Lindsay Frost as Kristen Carter

Episodes

References
 Brooks, Tim, and Marsh, Earle, The Complete Directory to Prime Time Network and Cable TV Shows

External links
 
 Nick Mancuso, Boston Based Writer

1980s American drama television series
1989 American television series debuts
1990 American television series endings
1990s American drama television series
English-language television shows
NBC original programming
Television series by Universal Television
Television shows set in Washington, D.C.